Dugesia tubqalis is a species of dugesiid triclad that inhabits springs of Morocco. It is named after the Toubkal peak (Tubqal in Berber), the highest in the Atlas Mountains. It has been found between 1,702 and 2,164 m of altitude.

Description
They have a pigmented dorsal surface, and a paler ventral surface. The head is triangle-shaped with two eyes in pigment free-patches.

References

tubqalis
Animals described in 2012
Endemic fauna of Morocco